Andollu is a town in Vitoria-Gasteiz, located in the province of Álava, in the autonomous community of Basque Country, northern Spain.

External links
 ANDOLLU in the Bernardo Estornés Lasa - Auñamendi Encyclopedia (Euskomedia Fundazioa) 

Vitoria-Gasteiz
Towns in Álava